The Kymin,, is a hill overlooking Monmouth, in Monmouthshire, Wales. It is located approximately one mile east of Monmouth, on the eastern side of the River Wye and adjacent to the border with the Forest of Dean and England.  The summit of the hill, about 800 feet above sea level, is known for its neo-classical monuments, the Roundhouse and the Naval Temple, built between 1794 and 1800. It is registered on the Cadw/ICOMOS Register of Parks and Gardens of Special Historic Interest in Wales. The site is within a designated Area of Outstanding Natural Beauty (AONB) and is owned by the National Trust.

The Roundhouse

History
The Roundhouse was built by members of the Monmouth Picnic Club or Kymin Club, a group of Monmouth's gentlemen, led by Philip Meakins Hardwick. The members of the Kymin Club were drawn from "the principal Gentlemen of Monmouth and its vicinity", and met each week "for the purpose of dining together, and spending the day in a social and friendly manner". The Roundhouse was constructed to provide "security from the inclemency of the weather" and the subscription list for funding was headed by the local landowner, the Duke of Beaufort, and eight Members of Parliament. Construction began in 1794, and the local author and artist Fred Hando records that the building "was completed within two years". The building was sited to take advantage of the views and the Monmouth antiquarian and publisher Charles Heath recorded in his 1807 history; Descriptive Account of the Kymin Pavilion and Beaulieu Grove with their various views; also a description of the Naval Temple that ten counties could be seen from the Roundhouse; (Gloucestershire, Monmouthshire, Glamorganshire, Breconshire, Montgomeryshire, Worcestershire, Herefordshire, Radnorshire, Shropshire and Somerset). A telescope by Peter Dollond was fitted in the upper room and Heath detailed a large number of the sights that could be viewed from the five windows.

Architecture and description
The Roundhouse is a white round tower, in two storeys with a crenellated roof, similar to a folly. The club members wanted a venue suitable for their regular meetings, dining and events and the building was designed with kitchens on the ground floor and a banqueting room above. The building was restored in the early 20th century, when it ceased to be used as a residence. It is a Grade II* listed building as of 27 June 1952.

The Naval Temple

History
The Naval Temple was constructed by the Kymin Club in 1800 to commemorate the second anniversary of the British naval victory at the Battle of the Nile in 1798 and in recognition of sixteen of the British Royal Navy's Admirals who had delivered significant victories in other major sea battles of the age around the globe to that date. The temple was dedicated by the Duchess of Beaufort, the daughter of Admiral Boscawen, one of those commemorated in the building. Nelson visited Monmouth in 1802, along with Lady Hamilton and her husband, Sir William Hamilton. They travelled on the River Wye from Ross-on-Wye to Monmouth, to be greeted by a cannonade and the band of the Monmouthshire Militia playing See, the Conquering Hero Comes. Staying in Monmouth for just a couple of days, Nelson visited the Naval Temple and the Roundhouse on Kymin Hill, where he breakfasted and admired the views. He was struck with the Naval Temple, saying that "it was the only monument of its kind erected to the Royal Navy in the Kingdom".

Sir Richard Colt Hoare saw the Temple in 1803, soon after its construction, and was unimpressed, describing it as "in very bad taste". Monmouthshire artist and author, Fred Hando, who described many Monmouthshire landmarks in his series of articles for the South Wales Argus running from 1922-1970, visited the Temple in 1964. At that time, the figure of Britannia had been lost, as had the two naval seascape paintings depicting the Battle of the Nile and The Standard of Great Britain Triumphant.

The temple has been restored on a number of occasions, most recently in 2012, following storm damage. The latest restoration saw the restoration of the statue of Britannia, the re-painting of the two seascapes and the re-installation of the gates.

Architecture and description

The memorial is classical in design, topped by a bronze seated figure of Britannia (now a replica). It comprises two porticos, back to back, with Doric columns. The architect is unknown but two preliminary designs, dated 1798 and signed by a T. Fidler, are held at the National Library of Wales. The architectural historian John Newman describes the architectural style as; "hard(..) to come to terms with". The temple is a Grade II listed building.

The square Naval Temple has round plaques or medallions, four on each face, for each Admiral and the victory with which he was most closely associated and its date. The named Admirals are:

 Vice Admiral Charles Thompson
 Rear Admiral Adam Duncan
 Vice Admiral Edward Boscawen
 Admiral Samuel Hood
 Admiral Howe
 Admiral John Warren
 Admiral John Gell (was retired locally near Crickhowell when this was built.)
 Admiral Lord Nelson
 Admiral of the Fleet John Jervis
 Vice Admiral George Rodney
 Admiral Hawke who was also First Lord of the Admiralty
 Vice Admiral Sir Alexander Hood
 Vice-Admiral William Cornwallis
 Admiral Hyde Parker
 Admiral George Elphinstone
 Admiral Andrew Mitchell

Today

The Kymin is accessed by a winding road climbing up off the A4136 Monmouth to Forest of Dean road. The area is managed and conserved by the National Trust and there is a car park near the summit with an easy walk to both the Temple and the Roundhouse. As of 2015, the building was open on Saturdays, Sundays and Mondays from 11.00 to 16.00 during the spring, summer and autumn. The views on a clear day have been described as magnificent. The site is listed at Grade II on the Cadw/ICOMOS Register of Parks and Gardens of Special Historic Interest in Wales.

The landscape features incorporated within the woodland at Beaulieu Grove were apparently destroyed early in the 19th century. The Woodland Trust is undertaking research into the history of the area, and provides access to the woods.

The Kymin Dash is a cross country running hill race held annually. The course covers about 7 miles, circling the town and both ascending and descending the Kymin by forest tracks, field paths and minor roads. The course record is 39m 50s, set by Huw Evans in 2015.

References

Sources

External links
 The Kymin - The National Trust
 The Kymin - Up close and high resolution aerial video of the Kymin, Roundhouse and Monument

Buildings and structures in Monmouth, Wales
Grade II* listed buildings in Monmouthshire
Registered historic parks and gardens in Monmouthshire
History of Monmouthshire
Monuments and memorials in Monmouthshire
National Trust properties in Wales
Towers in Wales
Mountains and hills of Monmouthshire
Dining clubs
Tourist attractions in Monmouthshire
Monmouth, Wales
Grade II* listed monuments and memorials